Goianinha is a municipality in the state of Rio Grande do Norte in the Northeast region of Brazil.

References 

Municipalities in Rio Grande do Norte